The US Open Tennis Championships is a hardcourt tennis tournament held annually in Queens, New York. Since 1987, the US Open has been chronologically the fourth and final Grand Slam tournament of the year. The other three, in chronological order, are the Australian Open, French Open and Wimbledon. The US Open starts on the last Monday of August and continues for two weeks, with the middle weekend coinciding with the US Labor Day holiday. The tournament is of one of the oldest tennis championships in the world, originally known as the U.S. National Championship, for which men's singles and men's doubles were first played in August 1881. It is the only Grand Slam that was not affected by cancellation of World War I and World War II or interrupted by the COVID-19 pandemic in 2020.

The tournament consists of five primary championships: men's and women's singles, men's and women's doubles, and mixed doubles. The tournament also includes events for senior, junior, and wheelchair players. Since 1978, the tournament has been played on acrylic hardcourts at the USTA Billie Jean King National Tennis Center in Flushing Meadows–Corona Park, Queens, New York City. The US Open is owned and organized by the United States Tennis Association (USTA), a non-profit organization, and the chairperson of the US Open is Patrick Galbraith. Revenue from ticket sales, sponsorships, and television contracts is used to develop tennis in the United States.

This tournament, from 1971 to 2021, employed standard tiebreakers (first to 7 points, win by 2) in every set of a singles match. Since 2022, new tiebreak rules were initiated and standardised in the final set for all four Grand Slams. Thus, when a match reaches 6–all in the last possible set (the third for women and fifth for men), an extended tiebreaker (first to 10 points, win by 2) is played. Hence, should the tiebreaker be even at 9-all, whoever scores two straight points wins the match and/or championship.

History

1881–1914: Newport Casino

The tournament was first held in August 1881 on grass courts at the Newport Casino in Newport, Rhode Island, which is now home to the International Tennis Hall of Fame. That year, only clubs that were members of the United States National Lawn Tennis Association (USNLTA) were permitted to enter. Richard Sears won the men's singles at this tournament, which was the first of his seven consecutive singles titles. From 1884 through 1911, the tournament used a challenge system whereby the defending champion automatically qualified for the next year's final, where he would play the winner of the all-comers tournament.

In the first years of the U.S. National Championship, only men competed and the tournament was known as the U.S. National Singles Championships for Men. In September 1887, six years after the men's nationals were first held, the first U.S. Women's National Singles Championship was held at the Philadelphia Cricket Club. The winner was 17-year-old Philadelphian Ellen Hansell. In that same year, the men's doubles event was played at the Orange Lawn Tennis Club in South Orange, New Jersey.

The women's tournament used a challenge system from 1888 through 1918, except in 1917. Between 1890 and 1906, sectional tournaments were held in the east and the west of the country to determine the best two doubles teams, which competed in a play-off for the right to compete against the defending champions in the challenge round.

The 1888 and the 1889 men's doubles events were played at the Staten Island Cricket Club in Livingston, Staten Island, New York.
In the 1893 Championship, the men's doubles event was played at the St. George Cricket Club in Chicago. In 1892, the US Mixed Doubles Championship was introduced and in 1899 the US Women's National Doubles Championship.

In 1915, the national championship was relocated to the West Side Tennis Club in Forest Hills, Queens, New York City. The effort to relocate it to New York City began as early as 1911 when a group of tennis players, headed by New Yorker Karl Behr, started working on it.

1915–1977: West Side Tennis Club
In early 1915, a group of about 100 tennis players signed a petition in favor of moving the tournament. They argued that most tennis clubs, players, and fans were located in the New York City area and that it would therefore be beneficial for the development of the sport to host the national championship there. This view was opposed by another group of players that included eight former national singles champions. This contentious issue was brought to a vote at the annual USNLTA meeting on February 5, 1915, with 128 votes in favor of and 119 against relocation. In August 1915, the men's singles tournament was held in the West Side Tennis Club, Forest Hills in New York City for the first time while the women's tournament was held in Philadelphia Cricket Club in Chestnut Hill, Philadelphia (the women's singles event was not moved until 1921). From 1917 to 1933, the men's doubles event was held in Longwood Cricket Club in Chestnut Hill, Massachusetts. In 1934, both men's and women's doubles events were held in Longwood Cricket Club.

From 1921 through 1923, the men's singles tournament was played at the Germantown Cricket Club in Philadelphia. It returned to the West Side Tennis Club in 1924 following completion of the 14,000-seat Forest Hills Stadium.</noinclude>
Although many already regarded it as a major championship, the International Lawn Tennis Federation officially designated it as one of the world's major tournaments commencing in 1924. At the 1922 U.S. National Championships, the draw seeded players for the first time to prevent the leading players from playing each other in the early rounds. From 1935 to 1941 and from 1946 to 1967, the men's and women's doubles were held at the Longwood Cricket Club.

Open era
The open era began in 1968 when professional tennis players were allowed to compete for the first time at the Grand Slam tournament held at the West Side Tennis Club. The previous U.S. National Championships had been limited to amateur players. Except for mixed doubles, all events at the 1968 national tournament were open to professionals. That year, 96 men and 63 women entered, and prize money totaled $100,000. In 1970, the US Open became the first Grand Slam tournament to use a tiebreaker to decide a set that reached a 6–6 score in games. From 1970 through 1974, the US Open used a best-of-nine-point sudden-death tiebreaker before moving to the International Tennis Federation's (ITF) best-of-twelve points system. In 1973, the US Open became the first Grand Slam tournament to award equal prize money to men and women, with that year's singles champions, John Newcombe and Margaret Court, receiving $25,000 each. From 1975, following complaints about the surface and its impact on the ball's bounce, the tournament played on clay courts instead of grass. This was also an experiment to make it more "TV friendly". The addition of floodlights allowed matches to be played at night.

Since 1978: USTA National Tennis Center

In 1978, the tournament moved from the West Side Tennis Club to the larger and newly constructed USTA National Tennis Center in Flushing Meadows, Queens,  to the north. The tournament's court surface also switched from clay to hard. Jimmy Connors is the only individual to have won US Open singles titles on three surfaces (grass, clay, and hard), while Chris Evert is the only woman to win US Open singles titles on two surfaces (clay and hard).

The US Open is the only Grand Slam tournament that has been played every year since its inception.

During the 2006 US Open, the complex was renamed to "USTA Billie Jean King National Tennis Center" in honor of Billie Jean King, a four-time US Open singles champion and women's tennis pioneer.

From 1984 through 2015, the US Open deviated from traditional scheduling practices for tennis tournaments with a concept that came to be known as "Super Saturday": the women's and men's finals were played on the final Saturday and Sunday of the tournament respectively, and their respective semifinals were held one day prior. The women's final was originally held in between the two men's semifinal matches; in 2001, the women's final was moved to the evening so it could be played on primetime television, citing a major growth in popularity for women's tennis among viewers. This scheduling pattern helped to encourage television viewership, but proved divisive among players because it only gave them less than a day's rest between their semifinals and championship match.

For five consecutive tournaments between 2008 through 2012, the men's final was postponed to Monday due to weather. In 2013 and 2014, the USTA intentionally scheduled the men's final on a Monday—a move praised for allowing the men's players an extra day's rest following the semifinals, but drew the ire of the ATP for further deviating from the structure of the other Grand Slams. In 2015, the Super Saturday concept was dropped, and the US Open returned to a format similar to the other Grand Slams, with women's and men's finals on Saturday and Sunday. However, weather delays forced both sets of semifinals to be held on Friday that year.

In 2018, the tournament was the first Grand Slam tournament that introduced the shot clock to keep a check on the time consumed by players between points. The reason for this change was to increase the pace of play. The clock is placed in a position visible to players, the chair umpire and fans. Since 2020, all Grand Slams, ATP, and WTA tournaments apply this technology.

In 2020, the event was held without spectators due to the COVID-19 pandemic. An announcement that the wheelchair tennis competition would not be held caused controversy because USTA did not consult with the disabled athletes prior to it, as it had consulted with the players' organizations for the non-disabled competitions. After accusations of discrimination, USTA was forced to backtrack, admitting that it should have discussed the decision with the disabled competitors and offering them either $150,000 to be split between them (compared with $3.3m to be split between the players affected by the cancellation of each of the men's and women's qualifying competition and reductions in the mixed-doubles pool), a competition as part of the Open with 95% of the 2019 prize fund, or a competition to be held at the USTA base in Florida.

Grounds

The grounds of the US Open have 22 outdoor courts (plus 12 practice courts just outside the East Gate) consisting of four "show courts" (Arthur Ashe Stadium, Louis Armstrong Stadium, the Grandstand, and Court 17), 13 field courts, and 5 practice courts.

The main court is the 23,771-seat Arthur Ashe Stadium, which opened in 1997. A US$180 million retractable roof was added in 2016. The stadium is named after Arthur Ashe, who won the men's singles title at the inaugural US Open in 1968, the Australian Open in 1970, and Wimbledon in 1975 and who was inducted into the International Tennis Hall of Fame in 1985. The next largest court is the 14,061-seat Louis Armstrong Stadium, which cost US$200 million to build and opened in 2018. The 6,400-seat lower tier of this stadium is separately ticketed, reserved seating while the 7,661-seat upper tier is general admission and not separately ticketed. The third largest court is the 8,125-seat Grandstand in the southwest corner of the grounds, which opened in 2016. Court 17 in the southeast corner of the grounds is the fourth largest stadium. It opened with temporary seating in 2011 and received its permanent seating the following year. It has a seating capacity of 2,800, all of which is general admission and not separately ticketed. It is nicknamed "The Pit", partly because the playing surface is sunk 8 feet into the ground. The total seating capacity for practice courts P1-P5 is 672 and for competition Courts 4–16 is 12,656, itemized as follows:

 Courts 11 & 12: 1,704 each
 Court 7: 1,494
 Court 5: 1,148
 Courts 10 & 13: 1,104 each
 Court 4: 1,066
 Court 6: 1,032
 Court 9: 624
 Courts 14 & 15: 502 each
 Courts 8 & 16: 336 each

All the courts used by the US Open are illuminated, allowing matches and television coverage to extend into primetime. In 2001, the women's singles final was intentionally scheduled for primetime for the first time. CBS Sports president Sean McManus cited significant public interest in star players Serena Williams and Venus Williams and the good ratings performance of the 1999 women's singles final, which was pushed into primetime by rain delays.

Surface
From 1978 to 2019, the US Open was played on a hardcourt surface called Pro DecoTurf. It is a multi-layer cushioned surface and classified by the International Tennis Federation as medium-fast. Each August before the start of the tournament, the courts are resurfaced. In March 2020, the USTA announced that Laykold would become the new court surface supplier beginning with the 2020 tournament.

Since 2005, all US Open and US Open Series tennis courts have been painted a shade of blue (trademarked as "US Open Blue") inside the lines to make it easier for players, spectators, and television viewers to see the ball. The area outside the lines is still painted "US Open Green".

Player line call challenges
In 2006, the US Open introduced instant replay reviews of line calls, using the Hawk-Eye computer system. It was the first Grand Slam tournament to use the system. The Open felt the need to implement the system because of the controversial quarterfinal match at the 2004 US Open between Serena Williams and Jennifer Capriati where important line calls and key points went against Williams were picked up and repeatedly shown on TV broadcasting the match and subsequently in various news reports to be clearly incorrect, including one point that was overruled by the chair umpire. Instant replay was available only on the Arthur Ashe Stadium and Louis Armstrong Stadium courts through the 2008 tournament. In 2009, it became available on the Grandstand court. Starting in 2018, all competition courts are outfitted with Hawk-Eye and all matches in the main draws (Men's and Women's Singles and Doubles) follow the same procedure each player is allowed three incorrect challenges per set, with one more being allowed in a tiebreak. Player challenges were eliminated in 2021, when the tournament became the second Grand Slam to fully incorporate Hawk-Eye Live, where all line calls are made electronically; the previous year's tournament had also incorporated Hawk-Eye Live on all courts except for Arthur Ashe and Louis Armstrong stadiums to reduce personnel during the COVID-19 pandemic.

In 2007, JPMorgan Chase renewed its sponsorship of the US Open and, as part of the arrangement, the replay system was renamed to "Chase Review" on in-stadium video and television.

Point and prize money distribution
Ranking points for the men (ATP) and women (WTA) have varied at the US Open through the years. Below is a series of tables for each of the competitions showing the ranking points on offer for each event:

Senior

Wheelchair

Junior

Prize money 

The total prize money for the 2022 US Open was $60,102,000 and is the largest package of all Grand Slams and the largest in tournament history. The package is divided as follows:

The men's and women's singles prize money (US$42,628,000) accounts for 70.9 percent of total player base compensation, while men's and women's doubles (US$6,943,200), men's and women's singles qualifying (US$6,259,200), and mixed doubles (US$667,700) account for 11.6 percent, 10.4 percent, and 1.1 percent, respectively. All prize money for the doubles competitions are distributed per team. The prize money for the wheelchair draw amounts to a total of US$1,032,000, which accounts for a total of 1.7 percent of the package, and additional expenses, such as per diem and direct hotel payments of US$2,571,900 accounts for a total of 4.3 percent.

In 2012, the USTA agreed to increase the US Open prize money to $50,400,000 by 2017. As a result, the prize money for the 2013 tournament was US$33.6 million, a record US$8.1 million increase from 2012. The champions of the 2013 US Open Series also had the opportunity to add US$2.6 million in bonus prize money, potentially bringing the total 2013 US Open purse to more than US$36 million. In 2014, the prize money was US$38.3 million. In 2015, the prize money was raised to US$42.3 million. In 2021, the USTA set a new record for the highest prize money and total player compensation in the tournament's history with $57,462,000, and also boosted the prize money for the qualifying tournament to $6,000,000, a 66% increase over the package in 2019.

Champions

Former champions

Men's singles
Women's singles
Men's doubles
Women's doubles
Mixed doubles
All champions

Current champions

Most recent finals

Records

Media and attendance

Media coverage

The US Open's website allows viewing of live streaming video, but unlike other Grand Slam tournaments, does not allow watching video on demand. The site also offers live radio coverage.

United States
ESPN took full control of televising the event in 2015. When taking over, ESPN ended 47 years of coverage produced and aired by CBS. ESPN uses ESPN and ESPN2 for broadcasts, while putting outer court coverage on ESPN+. The tournament briefly returned to broadcast television for only a few seconds in 2022, as ABC aired a quad box with a simulcast look in of ESPN2’s coverage multiple times during ABC’s college football coverage.

Other regions

Source

Recent attendance

2022: 776,120
2021: 631,134
2020: 0
2019: 737,872
2018: 732,663
2017: 691,143
2016: 688,542
2015: 691,280
2014: 713,642
2013: 713,026
2012: 710,803
2011: 658,664
2010: 712,976
2009: 721,059
2008: 720,227
2007: 715,587
2006: 640,000
2005: 659,538

Sources: US Open, Record Attendance 2019, City University of New York (CUNY)

See also

 List of US Open singles finalists during the Open Era, records and statistics

Notes

References

External links

 

 
Annual sporting events in the United States
Recurring sporting events established in 1881
Grand Slam (tennis) tournaments
Major tennis tournaments
Tennis
US Open Series
Hard court tennis tournaments in the United States
Tennis tournaments in New York City
1881 establishments in Rhode Island